Grafton is a community just outside Woodstock in the Canadian province of New Brunswick. It is situated in Northampton, a parish of Carleton County.

The Woodstock Airport is located here.

History

In July 1888, the entire village burned to the ground, leaving 200 people homeless. The local school was swiftly rebuilt before the beginning of 1889.

Notable people

See also
List of communities in New Brunswick

References

Communities in Carleton County, New Brunswick